Hoštka is a town in Litoměřice District in the Ústí nad Labem Region of the Czech Republic. It has about 1,800 inhabitants.

Administrative parts
Villages of Kochovice, Malešov and Velešice are administrative parts of Hoštka.

Geography
It lies in the Ralsko Uplands. The Obrtka stream flows through the town. The municipal territory is bordered by the Elbe on the south.

History
The first written mention of Hoštka is from 1266, when it was established by King Ottokar II of Bohemia. Until the 1360s, it was owned by Mikuláš Srša and his descendants. During their rule, Hoštka developed and expanded. The next owner was the bishopric in Prague. In the second half of the 16th century, Hoštka developed rapidly, a paper mill was established here, and tolls were collected on the Elbe.

Development was interrupted by the Thirty Years' War, during which Hoštka was damaged, but after the war it prospered again and the population grew. Ethnic Germans prevailed over Czechs, but even their minority was numerous. In 1853, Hoštka was promoted to a town. From 1938 to 1945, it was annexed by Nazi Germany and administered as part of Reichsgau Sudetenland. After the World War II, the German population was expelled and partially replaced by Czechs.

Sights
The Church of Saint Othmar was built in the late 15th century. The originally Gothic church was rebuilt in the early 18th century, but it preserved its Gothic core. Its tall prismatic tower is the landmark of the town square.

The Chapel of the Assumption of the Virgin Mary was built in the Baroque style in 1762. The baroque Column of the Holy Trinity dates from 1737.

Notable people
Johann Joseph Abert (1832–1915), German composer

References

External links

Populated places in Litoměřice District
Cities and towns in the Czech Republic